Murat Jumakeyev (born 27 November 1973 in USSR) is a Kyrgyzstani professional football player and manager.

Career
In 1990, he began his professional career for the FC Dostuk Sokuluk. In 1992–2002 he played for the FC Alga Bishkek. Second half of 2002 he spent in Kazakh club FC Batys Uralsk. In 2003, he returned to SKA-PVO Bishkek and after played until the club dissolved.

In 1993, he made his debut for the Kyrgyzstan.

In 2002, he started his coaching career in SKA-PVO Bishkek as playing coach. Later he coached FC Abdish-Ata Kant, FC Kant-77. In 2010 Murat Dzhumakeyev appointed caretaker coach of reactivated FC Alga Bishkek. After he trained the FC Dordoi-94 Bishkek, Kyrgyzstan Olympic national football team and U-21 team. Since April 2011 until September 2012 he was a coach of the Kyrgyzstan national football team. 19 September 2012 Murat Dzhumakeyev headed youth team in football. Currently he is a coach of the FC Dordoi Bishkek.

Career statistics

International

Honors

Club
Alga Bishkek/Alga-RIIF Bishkek/Alga-PVO Bishkek/SKA-PVO Bishkek
Kyrgyzstan League (5); 1992, 1993, 2000, 2001, 2002
Kyrgyzstan Cup  (9): 1992, 1993, 1997, 1998, 1999, 2000, 2001, 2002, 2003
Abdish-Ata Kant
Kyrgyzstan Cup  (1): 2007

References

External links
 
 Profile at Soccerpunter.com
 
 
 

1973 births
Living people
Kyrgyzstani footballers
Kyrgyzstan international footballers
Association football defenders
FC Alga Bishkek players
FC Akzhayik players
FC Abdysh-Ata Kant players
Kyrgyzstani football managers
FC Alga Bishkek managers
FC Abdysh-Ata Kant managers
FC Dordoi Bishkek managers
Kyrgyzstan national football team managers